Modou Jobe (born 13 June 2000) is a Gambian footballer.

Club career
He is the product of Superstars Academy. He then spent two years in Israel with Hapoel Ramat Gan debuting in the Liga Leumit. He played back half year before joining Serbian SuperLiga side Inđija where he played the second half of the
2020-21 season. Having the club ended relegated Jobe was released in Summer 2021.

References

2000 births
Living people
Association football forwards
Gambian footballers
Hapoel Ramat Gan F.C. players
FK Inđija players
Liga Leumit players
Serbian SuperLiga players
Gambian expatriate footballers
Expatriate footballers in Israel
Expatriate footballers in Serbia
Gambian expatriate sportspeople in Israel
Gambian expatriate sportspeople in Serbia